Villa Felicidad is a hamlet (caserío) in the Canelones Department of southern Uruguay.

Location

Population
In 2011 Villa Felicidad had a population of 1,344.
 
Source: Instituto Nacional de Estadística de Uruguay

References

External links
INE map of Villa Felicidad and Fraccionamiento Progreso

Populated places in the Canelones Department